Jade Faulkner (born 21 December 1993) is a competitor in rhythmic gymnastics. Born in Coventry, West Midlands, England, Faulkner represented Great Britain in the team event at the 2012 London Olympics. She represented Nigeria at the 2018 Commonwealth Games after changing nation representation.

She currently is a rhythmic gymnastics coach at Olympic Stars, a professional center of rhythmic gymnastics and ballet in Doha, Qatar.

References

External links
Jade Faulkner at British Gymnastics

1993 births
Living people
British rhythmic gymnasts
Olympic gymnasts of Great Britain
Gymnasts at the 2012 Summer Olympics
Sportspeople from Coventry